Wayne R. Douglas (born 1951/1952) is an American lawyer and jurist serving as an associate justice of the Maine Supreme Judicial Court. Nominated in February 2023 by Governor Janet Mills, he assumed office on March 10, 2023.

Education 
Douglas earned a Bachelor of Arts from Bates College in 1974 and a Juris Doctor from the University of Maine School of Law in 1979.

Career 
After graduating from law school, Douglas spent a decade at Pierce Atwood in Portland, Maine. He later served as chief legal advisor to then-Governor Angus King and as an associate commissioner of the Maine Department of Mental Health. King later appointed Douglas to serve as a judge of the Maine Superior Court. In February 2023, Governor Janet Mills nominated Douglas to serve as an associate justice of the Maine Supreme Judicial Court. He was sworn in on March 10, 2023.

References 

1950s births
Living people
20th-century American lawyers
21st-century American judges
Bates College alumni
Justices of the Maine Supreme Judicial Court
Maine lawyers
Maine state court judges
University of Maine School of Law alumni